The 1989–90 2. Bundesliga season was the sixteenth season of the 2. Bundesliga, the second tier of the German football league system.

Hertha BSC and SG Wattenscheid 09 were promoted to the Bundesliga while KSV Hessen Kassel, SpVgg Bayreuth, Alemannia Aachen and SpVgg Unterhaching were relegated to the Oberliga.

League table
For the 1989–90 season KSV Hessen Kassel, SpVgg Unterhaching, MSV Duisburg and Preußen Münster were newly promoted to the 2. Bundesliga from the Oberliga while Stuttgarter Kickers and Hannover 96 had been relegated to the league from the Bundesliga.

Results

Top scorers 
The league's top scorers:

References

External links
 2. Bundesliga 1989/1990 at Weltfussball.de 
 1989–90 2. Bundesliga at kicker.de 

1989-90
2
Ger